Vale Royal was, from 1974 to 2009, a local government district with borough status in Cheshire, England. It contained the towns of Northwich, Winsford and Frodsham.

History
The district was created on 1 April 1974 under the Local Government Act 1972 covering the area of three former districts and part of a fourth, which were abolished at the same time:
Northwich Rural District
Northwich Urban District
Runcorn Rural District (part)
Winsford Urban District

The district took its name from Vale Royal Abbey, formerly one of the largest in England, which was situated near the village of Whitegate near the centre of the district. The name was suggested in 1972 by a joint committee of the previous district councils, on the basis of the historic use of the name for the general area of the new district. The district was granted borough status on 5 May 1988, allowing the chairman of the council to take the title of mayor.

In 2006 the Department for Communities and Local Government considered reorganising Cheshire's administrative structure as part of the 2009 structural changes to local government in England. The decision to merge Vale Royal with the districts of Chester and Ellesmere Port and Neston to create a single unitary authority was announced on 25 July 2007, following a consultation period in which a proposal to create a single Cheshire unitary authority was rejected.

Vale Royal was abolished on 31 March 2009, with the area becoming part of the new unitary authority of Cheshire West and Chester from 1 April 2009.

Civil parishes

The district comprised the following civil parishes:

Acton Bridge
Allostock
Alvanley
Anderton with Marbury
Antrobus
Aston
Barnton
Bostock
Byley
Comberbach
Crowton
Cuddington
Darnhall
Davenham
Delamere
Dutton
Frodsham
Great Budworth
Hartford
Helsby
Kingsley
Lach Dennis
Little Budworth
Little Leigh
Lostock Gralam
Lower Peover
Manley
Marston
Moulton
Norley
Northwich
Oakmere
Rudheath
Rushton
Sproston
Stanthorne
Sutton
Tarporley
Utkinton
Weaverham
Whitegate and Marton
Whitley
Wimboldsley
Wincham
Winsford

Political control
The first elections to the council were held in 1973, initially operating as a shadow authority until the new arrangements came into effect on 1 April 1974. Political control of the council from 1974 until its abolition in 2009 was held by the following parties:

Leadership
The leaders of the council from 1988 were:

Composition
The political composition of the council at its abolition in 2009 was:

Premises

Until 1990 the council operated from the various offices it had inherited from its predecessors, being Whitehall in Hartford (from Northwich Rural District Council), the Council House in Northwich (from Northwich Urban District Council), Castle Park House in Frodsham (from Runcorn Rural District Council), and Over Hall in Winsford (from Winsford Urban District Council). In 1990 the council consolidated its offices into a new purpose-built headquarters called Wyvern House on The Drumber in Winsford. Wyvern House was formally opened by Princess Margaret on 19 July 1991. Since the council's abolition in 2009, Wyvern House has been used as one of the offices of its successor, Cheshire West and Chester Council.

Council elections
1973 Vale Royal District Council election
1976 Vale Royal District Council election (New ward boundaries)
1979 Vale Royal District Council election
1983 Vale Royal District Council election (District boundary changes took place but the number of seats remained the same)
1987 Vale Royal District Council election
1991 Vale Royal Borough Council election (Borough boundary changes took place but the number of seats remained the same)
1995 Vale Royal Borough Council election
1999 Vale Royal Borough Council election (New ward boundaries)
2003 Vale Royal Borough Council election
2007 Vale Royal Borough Council election

By-election results

External links
Vale Royal Council

References 

Council elections in Cheshire
District council elections in England
Districts of England established in 1974
English districts abolished in 2009
Former non-metropolitan districts of Cheshire
Former boroughs in England